After Eight is the debut album by Indonesian-born Dutch singer and songwriter Taco Ockerse, mononymously known as Taco.  The record, released in 1982 by RCA Records, contained his biggest (and only ever) Stateside hit, a synth and New Wave driven take on the Irving Berlin standard "Puttin' on the Ritz". However, in addition to six covers of classic pop songs, he co-wrote five original songs.

The album peaked at No. 23 on the Billboard 200.

Track listing
"Singin' in the Rain" (Arthur Freed, Nacio Herb Brown) 4:45
"Tribute to Tino" (Werner Lang, Taco Ockerse, Ray Moxley) 4:10
"Puttin' on the Ritz" (Irving Berlin) 4:36
"I Should Care" (Paul Weston, Sammy Cahn, Axel Stordahl) 3:42
"Carmella" (John David Parker-Tanja, Lang, Ockerse) 3:28
"La Vie en Rose" (Edith Piaf, Ralph Maria Siegel, H. Doll, Louiguy) 4:45
"Cheek to Cheek" (Berlin) 4:45
"After Eight" (Tanja, Ockerse, Lang) 3:28
"Livin' in My Dream World" (Tanja, Lang, Ockerse) 3:06
"Encore/Sweet Gypsy Rose" (Tanja, Lang, Ockerse) 4:14
"Thanks a Million" (Gus Kahn, Arthur Johnston) 1:45

Production
Arranged by Werner Lang and David Parker
Produced by David Parker
Recorded and Mixed by Frank Reinke

Charts

Sales and certifications

References

Taco (musician) albums
1982 debut albums
RCA Records albums